Buryabaf (also Romanized as Būryābāf, Būrā Bāf, Bure Abāf, and Būrīā Bāf) is a village in Hemmatabad Rural District, in the Central District of Borujerd County, Lorestan Province, Iran. At the 2006 census, its population was 190, in 48 families.

References 

Towns and villages in Borujerd County